The 2001 Shell Turbo Chargers season was the 17th season of the franchise in the Philippine Basketball Association (PBA).

Draft picks

Transactions

Roster

 Team Manager: Bobby Villarosa

Elimination round

Games won

References

Shell
Shell Turbo Chargers seasons